Chapoania is a genus of moths belonging to the family Tortricidae.

Species
Chapoania dentigera Razowski, 1999

References

 , 2005: World Catalogue of Insects vol. 5 Tortricidae.
 , 1999, Polskie Pismo Ent. 68: 68

External links
tortricidae.com

Euliini
Tortricidae genera
Taxa named by Józef Razowski